State Road 603 (NM 603) is a  state highway in the US state of New Mexico. NM 603's southern terminus is at U.S. Route 60 (US 60) in Pie Town, and the northern terminus is at NM 36 north of Quemado.

Major intersections

See also

References

603
Transportation in Catron County, New Mexico